Combat Engineers is the military engineering formation of the Singapore Army, providing mobility by bridging gaps and clearing minefields to facilitate speedy advance of troops into enemy territory, and counter-mobility by constructing obstacles such as anti-tank ditches to impede the enemy's movement. Combat Engineers also construct trenches, drainage systems and other related infrastructure to enhance the survivability of troops during operations.

History 
The Combat Engineers formation was established in early 1967 as the Engineer Training Wing of SAFTI in Pasir Laba Camp. In July that year, two newly commissioned officers – Second Lieutenants Gurcharan Singh and Chng Teow Hua – were selected to attend the Engineer Officer Basic Course at Fort Belvoir in the United States. After they completed the course, they returned to Singapore, where they and the commanding officer, Major George Mitchell, conducted the first engineer commander's course for officer cadets in the Engineer Training Wing.

The Engineer Training Wing moved to Pulau Blakang Mati (now Sentosa) in 1968 and was renamed School of Field Engineers. It eventually relocated to Nee Soon Camp. As the Combat Engineers formation grew, HQ Engineers was established in April 1970 to serve as a centralised command. It was renamed HQ Singapore Combat Engineers (HQ SCE) in 1973.

Operations 
The Singapore Combat Engineers have been involved in a number of missions and operations in both Singapore and overseas over the years. During the 1974 Laju ferry hijacking, 1975 Operation Thunderstorm and 1991 SQ 117 hijacking, they were activated to identify and defuse explosive devices. They also assisted the Bangladeshi government in disposing an unexploded 500-pound aerial bomb found in an industrial park in 1978.

Besides explosive ordnance disposal, the Singapore Combat Engineers have also provided support in disaster relief and humanitarian aid operations, such as during the 1986 Hotel New World collapse in Singapore, the 1991 United Nations Iraq–Kuwait Observation Mission, the 2004 Indian Ocean earthquake and tsunami, the humanitarian aid mission in Afghanistan from 2007 to 2013, the 2009 Sumatra earthquakes, and the 2011 Christchurch earthquake.

Organisation 
The Combat Engineers formation is composed of HQ Singapore Combat Engineers (HQ SCE), the Engineer Training Institute (ETI), five active battalions – the 30th, 35th, 36th, 38th and 39th Battalions, Singapore Combat Engineers – and an undisclosed number of reservist battalions.

There are five vocations in the Combat Engineers formation: Field Engineer, Bridging Engineer, Explosives Ordnance Disposal (EOD) Engineer, Armoured Engineer, and Chemical, Biological and Radiological Defence (CBRD) Engineer. Field Engineers provide mobility, counter-mobility and survivability support to the Singapore Army's divisions and brigades. Bridging Engineers provide bridging support to the main force. EOD Engineers identify and dispose explosive ordnance, and conduct security sweeps at important national events. Armoured Engineers operate their equipment to support Armour units in missions. CBRD Engineers respond to CBR hazards and provide CBR coverage at important national events.

Equipment

See also 
 Assault pioneer
 Sapper

References 

Combat Engineers
Military units and formations established in 1967
Military engineer corps